Joseph "Momo" Howard (born 22 May 1966 in Boston, Massachusetts) is an ice sledge hockey player from United States. Howard lost both of his legs at the age of 15. In 1982, he was introduced to ice sledge hockey, and competed in his first Winter Paralympics at the 1998. At those games, the USA came in seventh place but Howard set a record with six goals in one match. At the 2002 Winter Paralympics, Howard contributed with three points in a 5–1 defeat of Canada. In the gold medal game, After an overtime shootout victory, the Americans prevailed defeating defending champions Norway  4–3.
Going undefeated (6-0), outscoring opponents 26–6 in the tournament.
Joe was named MVP of the gold medal game. Scoring three goals and adding one assist. He was named a first team all-star.
Howard's hard-fought first-place finish was extra special.  He fulfilled a promise he made to his mother, who was unable to attend as she was ill with cancer, by winning the Gold. Following the USA's victory over Estonia, he proposed to his girlfriend of five years Carol Tribuna on the center of the rink. He took part in the 2010 Winter Paralympics in Vancouver, where USA won gold. Going undefeated and not allowing a goal during the tournament, outscoring their opponents 19–0,  They beat Japan 2–0 in the final. Howard had both assists, and helped earn his second Paralympic Gold Medal

Awards and honors
  
2010: Gold Medal  - Vancouver 2010 Paralympics
2006: Bronze Medal - Torino, Italy 2206 Paralympcs, Team Captain, First Team All Star
2004: Silver medal  - World Championships, Ornskoldsvik Sweden, Team Captain, First Team All Star
2002: Gold medal - Salt Lake City 2002 Paralympics - Team Captain, Game MVP, Team MVP, First Team AllStar
2002: Inducted into Massachusetts Hockey Hall of Fame
2002: USA Hockey Bob Johnson Award recipient
2002: Olympic Spirit Award recipient
2002: New England Wheelchair Athletic Association Athlete of the year
2002: Olympic Spirit Award recipient
2000: Captain of U.S. National Sled Hockey Team
1998: Paralympic record six goals in single game (double hattrick)
1998: Paralympic Games, Nagano Japan
1997: Swedish Winter Games, Soleftea Sweden

References

External links
Profile at Vancouver 2010 
Profile at Salt Lake City 2002
Paralympic.org - Results

1966 births
Living people
American sledge hockey players
Ice sledge hockey players at the 1998 Winter Paralympics
Ice sledge hockey players at the 2002 Winter Paralympics
Ice sledge hockey players at the 2006 Winter Paralympics
Ice sledge hockey players at the 2010 Winter Paralympics
Sportspeople with limb difference
Medalists at the 2006 Winter Paralympics
Medalists at the 2010 Winter Paralympics
Paralympic gold medalists for the United States
Paralympic medalists in sledge hockey
Paralympic sledge hockey players of the United States